Pasajero (Traveler) is the twelfth studio album from the band Gipsy Kings. It was originally released on October 3, 2006 internationally and released in the United States on January 23, 2007. Both versions are identical.

Track listing

Credits
Executive producer – Freddy Lamotte, Pascal Imbert, Peter Himberger
Mixed and recording – Frank Redlich - mixing, recording
Producer – The Gipsy Kings*, Philippe Eidel
Writing credits: Antonio Rivas (track 13), Francisco Repilado (track 5), Gipsy Kings (tracks 1 2 3 4 6 7 8 9 10 11 12 13 14), Philippe Eidel (track 3)

Charts

References

External links
Pasajero at Discogs

2006 albums
Gipsy Kings albums
Nonesuch Records albums
Albums produced by Philippe Eidel